The Jamshed Bhabha Theatre is a 1109-seater theatre inaugurated on 24 November 1999 within The National Centre for the Performing Arts premises in Mumbai, India. It has hosted & staged Indian epics and classical concerts to western operas and ballets.

Besides the main auditorium, the theatre has three conference rooms, large foyer spaces and a museum. The acoustics of this theatre were designed to permit appreciation of individual instruments without any additional amplification.

The theatre is home to a 100-year-old staircase in its foyer. The staircase was donated to the NCPA by the Petit family. It was originally part of the Petit hall at Malabar Hill, made of Carrara marble shipped from Italy. When the Petit hall was demolished, the staircase was dismantled and stored in a warehouse for forty years until it was re-assembled and added to the theatre's foyer.

A new, permanent exhibition located in the foyer of JBT, which opened to the public on 16 May 2018, pays tribute to the life and legacy of Jamshed Bhabha. In 2016, the theatre hosted the first public shows of Mughal-e-Azam, a Broadway-style musical directed by Feroz Abbas Khan and jointly produced by Shapoorji Pallonji Group and the National Centre for the Performing Arts (India). The musical is based on the 1960 Bollywood film Mughal-e-Azam, directed by K. Asif and produced by Shapoorji Pallonji. In 2019, the theatre produced and premiered the Agatha Christie whodunnit classic, The Mirror Crack'd directed by Melly Still, produced by Pádraig Cusack, in a new version for an Indian audience by Ayeesha Menon, based on the adaptation by Rachel Wagstaff of the novel The Mirror Crack'd from Side to Side, and starring Sonali Kulkarni, Denzil Smith and Shernaz Patel.

See also
 Tata Theatre
 Experimental Theatre (NCPA)

References

External links
 Jamshed Bhabha Theater at the NCPA
 History of NCPA

1999 establishments in Maharashtra
Theatres in Mumbai
Theatres completed in 1999
20th-century architecture in India